Parliamentary elections were held in the Trust Territory of the Pacific Islands on 2 November 1976, except in Palau, where they were delayed until 7 December due to a legal challenge over redistricting. They were the last territory-wide elections; the planned elections in 1978 were cancelled as the territory was split into the Federated States of Micronesia, the Marshall Islands and Palau.

Electoral system
The bicameral Congress consisted of a 12-member Senate with two members from each of the six districts and a 22-member House of Representatives with seats apportioned to each district based on their population – seven from Truk, five from the Marshall Islands, four from Ponape, three from Palau, two from Yap and one from the new district of Kosrae. The Marianas district (which had previously elected three representatives) ceased to exist when the Northern Mariana Islands became a US commonwealth in 1975.

Elections were held every two years in November of even-numbered years, with all members of the House of Representatives and half the Senate (one member from each district) renewed at each election. Two senators were elected from the new district of Kosrae in 1976.

Results

Senate

House of Representatives

Aftermath
Following the elections, Tosiwo Nakayama was re-elected President of the Senate, whilst Bethwel Henry was re-elected Speaker of the House of Representatives.

References

Trust
Elections in the Federated States of Micronesia
Elections in the Marshall Islands
Elections in Palau
1976 in the Trust Territory of the Pacific Islands